Palha may refer to:

Places:
 Palha Carga, settlement in Santiago, Cape Verde
Palha Palace, palace in Lisbon, Portugal
Palha River, river in Brazil
São Gabriel da Palha, municipality in Brazil
People:
 Joana Palha (born 1969), Portuguese neuroscientist 
 Miguel Palha, Portuguese footballer
 Natasha Palha, Indian tennis player
Salvador Palha, rugby player
Films:
 Estrada de Palha, 2011 Portuguese film
Fogo de Palha, 1926 Brazilian film